Onyotaa:ka First Nation is a First Nations band government in Ontario.  It is also known as the Oneida Nation of the Thames.

External link
 Onyota'a:ka / Oneida Nation of the Thames

First Nations governments in Ontario